Ernest Frederick Beal VC (27 January 1883 – 22 March 1918) was an English recipient of the Victoria Cross, the highest and most prestigious award for gallantry in the face of the enemy that can be awarded to British and Commonwealth forces.

Beal was born to John J. W. and Jane Stillman Beal, who resided at 55, East St., Brighton.

Military
Beal was 35 years old, and a temporary second lieutenant in 13th Battalion, The Yorkshire Regiment (Alexandra, Princess of Wales's Own), British Army during the First World War, and was awarded the Victoria Cross for his actions on 21/22 March 1918 at St-Léger, France.

Commemoration
Beal is commemorated on the Arras Memorial. His Victoria Cross is displayed at the Green Howards Museum, Richmond, North Yorkshire, England. Two Brighton & Hove buses have been named after him. Additionally, he is named on the panels commemorating the fallen from the First World War in the hall of Brighton, Hove and Sussex Sixth Form College, for alumni of the preceding institution, Brighton, Hove and Sussex Grammar School.

A gold locket containing Beale's portrait and decorated with a Victoria Cross emblem was shown by his great-nephew, in an episode of Antiques Roadshow in December 2021.

References

Monuments to Courage (David Harvey, 1999)
The Register of the Victoria Cross (This England, 1997)
VCs of the First World War - Spring Offensive 1918 (Gerald Gliddon, 1997)

External links
 Bus naming

1880s births
1918 deaths
Green Howards officers
British World War I recipients of the Victoria Cross
British military personnel killed in World War I
British Army personnel of World War I
People from Brighton
British Yeomanry soldiers
Royal Sussex Regiment soldiers
British Army recipients of the Victoria Cross
Military personnel from Sussex